The Katanga thick-toed gecko (Pachydactylus katanganus) is a species of lizard in the family Gekkonidae. It is found in the Republic of the Congo and Malawi.

References

Pachydactylus
Reptiles described in 1953
Reptiles of the Republic of the Congo
Reptiles of Malawi